Hynobius katoi is a species of salamander in the family Hynobiidae, endemic to Japan. Its natural habitats are temperate forests and rivers.

References

katoi
Amphibians described in 2004
Endemic amphibians of Japan
Taxonomy articles created by Polbot
Taxa named by Masafumi Matsui
Taxa named by Yasuhiro Kokuryo
Taxa named by Yasuchika Misawa
Taxa named by Kanto Nishikawa